Hojjatabad-e Kaseh Rud (also Romanized as Ḩojjatābād-e Kāseh Rūd; also known as Ḩojjatābād) is a village in Forg Rural District, Forg District, Darab County, Fars Province, Iran. At the 2006 census, its population was 38, in 8 families.

References 

Populated places in Darab County